Several ships of the Swedish Navy have been named HSwMS Tirfing, named after Tyrfing, a magic sword in Norse mythology:

  was a  launched in 1866 and decommissioned in 1922
  was a  launched in 1981 and sold in 2008

Swedish Navy ship names